Gamze İskeçeli (born May 26, 1983) is a former Turkish women's football forward, who lately played in the Women's First League for Konak Belediyespor with jersey number 9. She made her Champions League debut in 2013. İskeçeli was a member of the Turkish national team since 2001.

Early life
Gamze İskeçeli was born on May 28, 1983, in İzmir, western Turkey.

At the age of six, she got interested in football playing. Her father supported Gamze, and registered her in a İzmir-based sport club. However, at that time, there was no girls' football team available, so she had to play with her coeval boys. The talented girl became even top scorer among them.

She studied physical education and sports at Gazi University in Ankara between 2002 and 2007. Today, she works as a teacher of physical education in a primary school in Buca, İzmir.

Playing career

Club
She entered İzmirspor with her father's and uncle's initiative. After playing two years football with boys, she was admitted to Altay S.K. After the dissolving of Altay in ashort time, she went to İzmir Öztürkspor. İskeçeli received her license on November 8, 1999. As once the goalkeeper got injured, İskeçeli, normally a forward, served also as goalkeeper. In this position, she transferred to the newly formed Van Eğitimspor at Van, eastern Turkey in February 2001.

She received an offer from Gazi University for higher education, and so moved to Gazi Üniversitesispor in January 2002. After four seasons with Gazi Üniversitesispor, and completing her education there, İskeçeli returned home and paused for a while. Then, she joined Bucaspor in the 2006–07 season.

Finally, she signed for Konak Belediyespor in the 2009–10 season. At the end of the 2012–13 season, she enjoyed league championship with her club Konak Belediyespor. Iskeçeli debuted in the 2013–14 UEFA Women's Champions League match against FC NSA Sofia on August 8, 2013, and played in the subsequent preliminary round matches.

Beside her playing career, she acts also as a football coach in the school she is serving as a teacher. After coaching initially the boys' team, she formed a girls' football team, which became provincial champion in futsal and football.

International
On September 9, 2000, İskeçeli became part of the U-19 national team in the match against Austrian junior women. She capped sixteen times in total, and participated thereby at the 2001 and 2002 UEFA Women's Under-19 Championship qualifying round matches.

İskeçeli made her debut in the national team on May 20, 2001, playing in the friendly match against the Greek team. She took part at the 2003 FIFA Women's World Cup qualification – UEFA Group 8, 2005 Summer Universiade, 2015 FIFA Women's World Cup qualification – UEFA Group 6 matches and a UEFA Women's Euro 2013 qualifying – Group 2 match. She capped seventeen times for the Turkey national team as of November 28, 2013.

In addition to her capacity as forward, İskeçeli played also as goalkeeper for the national team.

Retirement
Gamze İskeçeli sustained an injury to her right leg during the 2015 FIFA Women's World Cup qualification – UEFA Group 6 match against Montenegro in Izmir on November 28, 2013. She decided to retire from active sports after the rupture of her cruciate ligament was cured.

Career statistics

Honours

Turkish Women's First League
 Bucaspor
 Runners-up (2): 2007–08, 2008–09

 Konak Belediyespor
 Champions (2): 2012–13, 2013–14
 Runners-up (1): 010–11
 Third places (1): 2009–10

References

Living people
1983 births
Footballers from İzmir
Turkish women's footballers
Gazi University alumni
Women's association football forwards
Women's association football goalkeepers
Gazi Üniversitesispor players
Bucaspor women's players
Konak Belediyespor players
Turkey women's international footballers
Turkish schoolteachers
Turkish football managers
21st-century Turkish sportswomen